Bubble Jet may refer to:

 A type of inkjet printer
 The bubble jet effect, an effect of underwater explosions